William Alexander Gerhardie OBE FRSL (21 November 1895 – 15 July 1977) was an Anglo-Russian novelist and playwright. His first novel, Futility (1922), drew on his experiences of fighting the Bolsheviks in pre-revolutionary Russia.

Life and career
Gerhardie (or Gerhardi – he added the "e" in later years) was born at St Petersburg, Russia, the fifth of six children of Charles Alfred Gerhardi (1864–1925), a British expatriate industrialist, and his wife Clara Annie (1869–1948), daughter of John Wadsworth. He was educated at the Sankt Annenschule and Deutsche Reformierte Kirchenschule in St Petersburg, before completing his education in England at Worcester College, Oxford.

In 1915, during the First World War he enlisted in the Royal Scots Greys and trained in England while applying for a commission as an officer. After commissioning in 1916 he was posted to the staff of the British Military Attaché at Petrograd (as his birth city was then renamed) until 1918. During that period he witnessed the development of the 1917 Revolution which ruined his father who escaped Russia to exile in England having been allowed out through being identified with the (already dead) British socialist Keir Hardie.

During the Allied intervention in the Russian Civil War following the revolution he was attached to the 3rd Battalion of the Scots Guards and served on the British Military Mission to the White Russian forces in Siberia. He was demobilised with the rank of captain in 1920, having been mentioned in despatches, appointed an Officer of the Order of the British Empire (OBE), and awarded the Imperial Russian Order of St Stanislaus and the Czechoslovak War Cross.

Gerhardie was one of the most critically acclaimed English novelists of the 1920s (Evelyn Waugh told him, "I have talent, but you have genius.") H. G. Wells also championed his work. His first novel, Futility, was written while he was at Oxford University and drew on his experiences in Russia fighting (or attempting to fight) the Bolsheviks, along with his childhood experiences visiting pre-revolutionary Russia. Some say that it was the first work in English to explore fully the theme of "waiting", later made famous by Samuel Beckett in Waiting for Godot, but it is probably more apt to recognize a common comic nihilism between those two figures. His next novel, The Polyglots, is probably his masterpiece (although some argue for Doom). Again it deals with Russia (Gerhardie was strongly influenced by the tragi-comic style of Russian writers such as Anton Chekhov, about whom he wrote a study while in college).

He collaborated with Hugh Kingsmill on the biography The Casanova Fable, his friendship with Kingsmill being both a source of conflict over women and a great intellectual stimulus.

In the Second World War, Gerhardie served in the Officers Emergency Reserve and from 1942 to 1945 he worked with the BBC in its European Division, where he was first editor of the "English by Radio" language programme.

After that war Gerhardie's star waned, and he became unfashionable. Although he continued to write, he published no new work after 1939. After a period of poverty-stricken oblivion, he lived to see two "definitive collected works" published by Macdonald in 1947–49, revised in 1970–74 with prefaces by Michael Holroyd who consistently championed his work. He was made a fellow of the Royal Society of Literature in 1975. After his death, an idiosyncratic study of world history between 1890 and 1940 was discovered among his papers, which was edited by Holroyd and Robert Skidelsky and published as God's Fifth Column. More recently, both Prion and New Directions Press have been reissuing his works.

Gerhardie lived the last 37 years of his life in the West End of London in increasing seclusion. He died at the Middlesex Hospital in June 1977 aged 81. After cremation his ashes were scattered in Regent's Park, at a gathering that included the writers Olivia Manning and J. G. Farrell.

Asked how to say his name, he told the Literary Digest it was "pronounced jer (as Ger in Gerald) hardy, with the accent on the a: jer-har'dy. This is the way I and my relatives pronounce it, though I am told it is incorrect. Philologists are of the opinion that it should be pronounced with the g as in Gertrude. I believe they are right. I, however, cling to the family habit of mispronouncing it. But I do so without obstinacy. If the world made it worth my while I would side with the multitude."

The contemporary British novelist William Boyd has identified Gerhardie, along with Cyril Connolly, as key inspirations for the central character (the writer Logan Mountstuart) in his 2002 novel Any Human Heart. A television adaptation was released in the UK in 2010, and in the US in 2011.

Selected works
Futility (1922, 2012) Cobden Sanderson
The Polyglots (1925, 2013) Cobden Sanderson
Doom (1928) Duckworth. Also published as Jazz and Jasper, Eva's Apples, My Sinful Earth
Memoirs of a Polyglot: The Autobiography of William Gerhardie (1931)
The Memoirs of Satan (1932) with Brian Lunn
Resurrection (1934) Cassell
Of Mortal Love (1936), Revised and Republished by Macdonald & Co. (1970)
My Wife's the Least of It (1938) Faber
God's Fifth Column: A Biography of the Age 1890–1940 (1981) Simon and Schuster

References

Further reading
Dido Davies. (1991) William Gerhardie: A Biography (Oxford, UK: Oxford University Press)

External links
William Gerhardie Collection at the Harry Ransom Center
Article from the Social Affairs Unit blog on Gerhardie

1895 births
1977 deaths
Alumni of Worcester College, Oxford
British male dramatists and playwrights
English male novelists
20th-century English novelists
20th-century British dramatists and playwrights
20th-century English male writers
Recipients of the Czechoslovak War Cross
Emigrants from the Russian Empire to the United Kingdom